(Catalina Sky Survey temporary designation 8TA9D69) was an ,  diameter asteroid that entered Earth's atmosphere on October 7, 2008.

It was the first time that an asteroid impact had been predicted before its entry into the atmosphere as a meteor.

Discovery 

The asteroid was discovered by Richard A. Kowalski at the Catalina Sky Survey (CSS) 1.5-meter telescope at Mount Lemmon, north of Tucson, Arizona, US, on October 6, 06:39 UTC, 19 hours before the impact.

It was notable as the first such body to be observed and tracked prior to reaching Earth. The process of detecting and tracking a near-Earth object, an effort sometimes referred to as Spaceguard, was put to the test. In total, 586 astrometric and almost as many photometric observations were performed by 27 amateur and professional observers in less than 19 hours and reported to the Minor Planet Center, which in eleven hours issued 25 Minor Planet Electronic Circulars with new orbit solutions as observations poured in. On October 7, 01:49 UTC, the asteroid entered the shadow of the Earth, which made further observations impossible.

Impact predictions were performed by University of Pisa's CLOMON 2 semi-automatic monitoring system as well as Jet Propulsion Laboratory's Sentry system. Spectral observations that were performed by astronomers at the 4.2-meter William Herschel Telescope at La Palma, Canary Islands are consistent with either a C-type or M-type asteroid.

Entry 

It exploded tens of kilometers above the ground with the energy of 0.9 to 2.1 kilotons of TNT over a remote area of the Nubian Desert, causing a large fireball or bolide.

A webcam captured the flash lighting up El-Gouna beach 725 kilometres north of the explosion (see this webcam frame). A low-resolution image of the explosion was captured by the weather satellite Meteosat 8. Infrasound detector arrays in Kenya also detected a sound wave from the direction of the expected impact corresponding to energy of 1.1 to 2.1 kilotons of TNT. Asteroids of this size hit Earth about two or three times a year.

These images have not been publicly released.

Recovered fragments 

A search of the impact zone that began on December 6, 2008, turned up  of rock in some 600 fragments. These meteorites are collectively named Almahata Sitta, which means "Station Six" and is a train station between Wadi Halfa and Khartoum, Sudan. This search was led by Peter Jenniskens from the SETI Institute, California and Muawia Shaddad of the University of Khartoum in Sudan and carried out with the collaboration of students and staff of the University of Khartoum. The initial 15 meteorites were found in the first three days of the search. Numerous witnesses were interviewed, and the hunt was guided with a search grid and specific target area produced by NASA's Jet Propulsion Laboratory in Pasadena, California.

Samples of the Almahata Sitta meteorite were sent for analysis to a consortium of researchers led by Jenniskens, the Almahata Sitta consortium, including NASA Ames in California, the Johnson Space Center in Houston, the Carnegie Institution of Washington, and Fordham University in New York City. The first sample measured was an anomalous ultra-fine-grained porous polymict ureilite achondrite, with large carbonaceous grains. Reflectance spectra of the meteorite, combined with the astronomical observations, identified asteroid 2008 TC3 as an F-type asteroid class. These fragile anomalous dark carbon-rich ureilites are now firmly linked to the group of F-class asteroids. Amino acids have been found on the meteorite. The nanodiamonds found in the meteorite were shown to have grown slowly, implying that the source is another planet in the solar system. More recently, in December 2020, further studies on the fragments have been reported. These studies revealed an extremely rare form of hydrated crystals, in a fragment called AhS 202, known as amphibole, suggesting to the researchers that 2008 TC3 early on likely belonged to a very large Ceres-class dwarf planet.

Richard Kowalski, who discovered the object, received a tiny fragment of Almahatta Sitta, a gift from friends and well-wishers on the Minor Planet Mailing List, which Kowalski founded in order to help connect professional and amateur astronomers.

Gallery

See also 

 Asteroid impact prediction
 1972 Great Daylight Fireball
 2014 AA
 2018 LA
 2019 MO
 
 
 
 Impact event
 List of notable asteroids
 WT1190F

References

Further reading

External links 

 Remanzacco Observatory photographs of the incoming space rock
 Telescopio Nazionale Galileo photograph of 2008 TC3
 Announcement with animation
 
 
 2008 TC3 orbit and observations at IAU Minor Planet Center
 
 
 

20081006
20081006
Discoveries by Richard Kowalski

Minor planet object articles (unnumbered)
Predicted impact events
October 2008 events